Charles Eusibius Janes (January 26, 1889 – June 21, 1983) was a Canadian politician who was a Member of Provincial Parliament in Legislative Assembly of Ontario from 1945 to 1963. He represented the riding of Lambton East for the Ontario Progressive Conservative Party.

Born in Watford, Ontario, he was a telephone company executive.

References

External links

1880s births
1983 deaths
Progressive Conservative Party of Ontario MPPs